Ittibittium oryza is a species of sea snail, a marine gastropod mollusk in the family Cerithiidae.

Distribution

Description 
The maximum recorded shell length is 3 mm.

Habitat 
Minimum recorded depth is 0 m. Maximum recorded depth is 52 m.

References

External links

Cerithiidae
Gastropods described in 1876